Coulderton is a coastal village in Cumbria, England. It is located just to the southwest of Egremont.

References

Villages in Cumbria
Borough of Copeland